Rhabdocosma dolini is a moth of the family Ypsolophidae. It is only known from Madagascar.

The wingspan is about 16 mm.

External links
 Two New Species Of Yponomeutoid Moths (Lepidoptera, Yponomeutidae, Plutellidae) From Madagascar

Ypsolophidae
Moths of Madagascar